Peter Goldie (5 November 1946 – 22 October 2011) was a British businessman and then academic philosopher with interests in ethics and aesthetics. He was the Samuel Hall Chair in Philosophy and Head of the Philosophy Discipline Area of the School of Social Sciences at University of Manchester. He was educated at Felsted.

Business career
Goldie had a 25-year career in business in the City of London, culminating as chief executive at the ill-fated British & Commonwealth, leaving in 1989.

Philosophy career
Goldie turned to Philosophy, in 1990. He studied at University College London for a BA degree and at Balliol College, Oxford for a BPhil followed by a DPhil, supervised by Bernard Williams, on emotion, mood and character. Following this, he was a lecturer at Magdalen College, Oxford, for two years and King's College London before becoming a professor at Manchester in 2005.

Personal life
Peter Goldie was married twice. He was survived by his wife Sophie Hamilton, and two sons from his first marriage. He died of cancer on 22 October 2011, aged 64.

Books 
 Who's Afraid of Conceptual Art, with Elisabeth Schellekens, Routledge, 2009
 Philosophy and Conceptual Art, edited with Elisabeth Schellekens, Oxford University Press, 2007
 The Aesthetic Mind, edited with Elisabeth Schellekens, Oxford University Press, 2011
 On Personality, London, Routledge, 2004
 Understanding Emotions: Mind and Morals, Ashgate, 2002
 The Emotions: A Philosophical Exploration, Oxford: Clarendon Press, 2000
 The Mess Inside: Narrative, Emotion, and the Mind, OUP Oxford, 2012

References 
Sources
GOLDIE, Prof. Peter Lawrence, Who Was Who, A & C Black, 1920–2015; online edn, Oxford University Press, 2014
Citations

Academics of King's College London
Academics of the University of Manchester
British ethicists
People educated at Felsted School
Alumni of University College London
Alumni of Balliol College, Oxford
1946 births
2011 deaths